Glyptorhagada kooringensis is a species of air-breathing land snails, terrestrial pulmonate gastropod mollusks in the family Camaenidae.

This species is endemic to Australia. Its natural habitat is in grazed, rocky areas. It is threatened by habitat loss due to fire and overgrazing.

References

Gastropods of Australia
kooringensis
Vulnerable fauna of Australia
Gastropods described in 1877
Taxa named by George French Angas
Taxonomy articles created by Polbot